The following is a list of works about Thomas Merton, publications about Thomas Merton, the Trappist monk from Abbey of Gethsemani.  The bibliography is organized into categories.  A separate list of works by Thomas Merton is also available.

Art criticism

Articles

Biographies

Correspondence

Devotions and meditations

Journals and newsletters

Literary criticism

Miscellaneous

Shaffer, Timothy J. (2008). "A (Not So) Secret Son of Francis:Thomas Merton’s Franciscan Lens for Seeing Heaven and Earth." The Merton Annual 21: 67-90.  OCLC 926181210 
Shaffer, Timothy Joseph. (2006). A secret son of Francis: the Franciscan influence in the thought and writings of Thomas Merton. OCLC 75959955

Poetry

Reference books

Selected writings

Audio

Video

External links

Thomas Merton at Larkspur Press

Bibliographies of people
Religious bibliographies